Little Talbot Island State Park is a Florida State Park located on Little Talbot Island,  northeast of Jacksonville on State Road A1A. The park covers the entire  island. Big Talbot Island State Park lies to the immediate north. The park contains maritime forests, dunes, and salt marshes on the western side of the island. Wild life includes river otters, marsh rabbits, bobcats, and a variety of native and migrating birds. Activities include camping, fishing, hiking, swimming, canoeing, nature watching and surfing.  Erosion on Big Talbot Island, coupled with sand deposition on Little Talbot, have resulted in Little Talbot Island becoming the larger of the two Talbot Islands. The largest continuous section of the Machaba Balu Preserve lies just to the west of Little Talbot Island.

Amenities include a full–facility campground, as well as a youth/group tent campground and beachside picnic pavilions. The park also has bath houses, a small boat ramp, a nature trail, and a playground. Bicycles and canoes can be rented at the campground. The park is open from 8:00 am till dark.

Gallery

References

External links
 Little Talbot Island State Park at Florida State Parks
 Little Talbot Island State Park at State Parks
 Little Talbot Island State Park at Absolutely Florida
 Little Talbot Island State Park at Wildernet

State parks of Florida
Parks in Duval County, Florida
Protected areas established in 1952
Northside, Jacksonville
1952 establishments in Florida